Martin Maurice Brandon-Bravo OBE (25 March 1932 – 15 August 2018) was a British Conservative politician who was Member of Parliament (MP) for Nottingham South from 1983 to 1992.

Career
He was a Conservative councillor for the City of Nottingham 1968–1970 and 1976–1987. Having stood unsuccessfully for Nottingham East in the 1979 general election, he was Member of Parliament (MP) for Nottingham South from 1983 to 1992 when he was defeated by Labour's Alan Simpson. In his time in Parliament he became Parliamentary Private Secretary to the Home Secretary, David Waddington (1989–1990), and subsequently to the Leader of the Lords (1990–1992).

After leaving Parliament, he became Councillor for West Bridgford West division of Nottinghamshire County Council (NCC) from 1993, serving as Deputy Leader of the party group, until retiring at the 2009 elections. Reflecting his economic and political contributions, he was appointed as an alderman of NCC in July 2009 and of the City of Nottingham in January 2012.

Sport
Brandon-Bravo was a successful club oarsman before becoming president of the forerunner to the present body in the sport of rowing, the Amateur Rowing Association, in 1993. He was a life Vice President of British Rowing, which has combined professionals and amateurs in one organisation. As an International Umpire he officiated at World and Olympic Championships, and was a founding member of the National Watersports Centre at Holme Pierrepont, Nottingham.

Personal life
He married Sally in 1964 and they had two sons, Paul and Joel. Martin Brandon-Bravo died in August 2018 at the age of 86.

Bibliography

References 

 Times Guide to the House of Commons 1992

1932 births
2018 deaths
Conservative Party (UK) MPs for English constituencies
Members of Nottinghamshire County Council
Officers of the Order of the British Empire
UK MPs 1983–1987
UK MPs 1987–1992
People from Stoke Newington